The election to elect the third vice president of Nepal was held on 17 March 2023.

The term of the incumbent vice president, Nanda Kishor Pun, first elected in 2015, was set to expire on 17 March 2023. He was term-limited and could not seek re-election, with the Constitution of Nepal barring him from doing so.

As Article 70 of the Constitution prohibits the vice president of being from the same sex or community as the president, and with Ram Chandra Poudel, a Khas Arya male, elected president, only candidates from non Khas Arya ethnicity were allowed to file their nominations for the election.

Electoral process 
The Vice President of Nepal is elected by the majority of the votes of all members of the electoral colleges. If no candidate is elected, a second round is held between the top two candidates of the first round, under the same majority. As the latter is of the total votes including blank and invalid ones as well as abstentions, it is possible no candidate is elected in the first and second rounds. A third may then be held with the same candidates as in the second. The candidate with the majority of valid votes is then elected vice president.

Part 6, Article 64 of the Constitution of Nepal 2015 sets the following qualifications for holding the presidency:
 A person shall be eligible to be president if he/she fulfils the following qualifications:
 He/she is eligible to be a member of the Federal Parliament.
 He/she has attained at least 45 years of age, and
 Is not ineligible by any law.
 Notwithstanding anything contained in clause (1), a person who has already been elected president for two terms, shall not be eligible to be a presidential candidate for the presidential election thereafter.

Election schedule 
The Election Commission announced the schedule for the vice presidential elections on 30 January 2023.

Electoral college 
The electoral college is composed in 2023 of 881 members, of which 331 are from the federal parliament and 550 from the provincial assemblies, with a vote "weight" of 79 and 48 each, respectively. While the federal parliament is made of 275 members from the lower house and 59 from the upper one, 2 members of the lower house were unable to be registered in the electoral college because of a judicial affair and a third one died, thus lowering the electoral college total from the normal number of 884 to 881, and the grand total of weighted votes from 52,786 to 52,549.

Electoral college composition

Electoral college vote value composition

Candidates 
On 11 March, a total of four candidates filed their nominations for the vice-presidential election. Three candidacies were filed from the ruling eight-party alliance; Ram Sahaya Yadav and Pramila Yadav of the PSPN and Mamata Jha of the Janamat Party. The opposition CPN (UML) put forward party vice-chair, Astalaxmi Shakya as its vice-presidential candidate.

Complaints were lodged against the candidacy of Ram Sahaya Yadav, by both the CPN (UML) and Janamat Party candidates, claiming the candidacy by Yadav is against the constitutional and legal provisions, as the constitution calls for the president and vice president to be of different genders or community. The electoral commission had initially announced that it was interpreting this as meaning vice president candidates had to be of both different gender and different community, prompting the PSPN to also propose the candidacy of Pramila Yadav. However, the Election Commission eventually changed opinion and quashed the complaints, ruling that Yadav's candidacy was lawful by concluding that legal provisions only require the president and the vice president to be from a different gender or a different community. Following this, the PSPN decided to withdraw the candidacy of Pramila Yadav.

People's Socialist Party, Nepal

Communist Party of Nepal (Unified Marxist–Leninist)

Janamat Party

Results

See also
2023 Nepalese presidential election

Notes

References